Naked as Water, by Mario Azzopardi, is a book of poems written originally in Maltese. Note that Mario Azzopardi (born 1944) should not be confused with Mario Philip Azzopardi (who has made a career in film-making in Canada).  The former Azzopardi is a poet, short story writer, university lecturer and cultural columnist and is the incumbent principal of the Malta Drama Centre. He made his first mark as a leading, radical poet in the nineteen-sixties. Naked as Water is a collection of verse by Mario Azzopardi, translated by Professor Grazio Falzon.

Summary 
The poems in this collection have been arranged into five sections:

Nocturnes and Visions —  poems of angst, nightmares, scenes from the village and city.
Anima — poems about women.
The Seven-Headed Dragon — poems about the larger-than-life poet and his quest.
Equinox —  poems on religious themes.
Tombstone With No Epitaph — abstract poems, poems on geometric relationships, poems about poetry itself.

Reviews 
"... Azzopardi's poems speak forcefully about Malta's history and independence as a culture."

"In Malta the catchphrase associated with Mario Azzopardi -- poet, teacher of literature and drama producer -- is enfant terrible."

"Naked As Water is a very exotic volume... The poems themselves are a studied primitivism filled with the primal reality of sea, sun and moon, but always with a sophisticated awareness of the 'isms' of twentieth-century art and literature. This is a very valuable book out of one last minority world of Europe that demands its place on the literary map."

Editions 
Translated from the Maltese, and with an Introduction and Afterword by Grazio Falzon; illustrations by Thomas M. Cassidy. Grand Terrace, CA: Xenos Books.   (paper), xiii + 178 p.

References

Maltese literature
Maltese books